WICC may refer to:

 WICC (AM), a news and information radio station in Bridgeport, Connecticut
 Women's International Champions Cup
 WONCA International Classification Committee, of the World Organization of Family Doctors
 Husein Sastranegara International Airport,  Bandung, West Java, Indonesia (ICAO airport code: WICC)
 Wessex Integrated Control Centre, a railway operational control centre at Waterloo Station in London, jointly operated by Network Rail and South West Trains